Chauliodus testa is an extinct viperfish in the family Stomiidae from the marine Late Miocene-aged Kurasi Formation of Western Sakhalin Island.

See also
 Viperfish

References

Chauliodus
Fish of the Pacific Ocean
Miocene fish of Asia
Fossils of Russia
Fossil taxa described in 2014